Dr Jozef Gécz   is a senior researcher at The University of Adelaide studying the various mutations of a small part of the X chromosome that lead to mental retardation.

Gécz was elected Fellow of the Australian Academy of Health and Medical Sciences (FAHMS) in 2015 and SA Scientist of the Year for 2019.

References

External links
 https://www.sagenomics.org/jozef-gecz
 http://genome-2018.p.asnevents.com.au/speaker/239202

1962 births
Scientists from Bratislava
Australian neuroscientists
Living people
Academic staff of the University of Adelaide
Place of birth missing (living people)
Fellows of the Australian Academy of Health and Medical Sciences
Fellows of the Australian Academy of Science